Gfiles award is an annual award presented to Civil Servants at the national level in India for extraordinary achievements in governance. This award is constituted by GFiles magazine, a national magazine on bureaucracy and governance. Winners are selected by the a jury comprising former senior bureaucrats and without the intervention of the government.

First award ceremony took place in 2012. The award ceremony takes place every year in Delhi. Recent award ceremony took place on 12 December at Civil Services Officers Institute(CSOI) where 13 Civil Servants were awarded.

Jury

Prabhat Kumar (Former Cabinet Secretary, Govt. of India) 
A 1964 batch UP Cadre IAS officer Sh. Prabhat Kumar has nearly forty years of rich and varied experience at various levels of governance from grassroots levels in the state to the highest level in the Center. He was the Cabinet Secretary of India during the Prime Ministership of Sh.Atal Bihari Vajpayee. Thereafter, he served as Governor of Jharkhand.

Anil Razdan (Former Secretary Power) 
A B.Sc (Hons.) Physics graduate from St. Stephen's College and a law graduate of Delhi University Law Faculty, Sh. Anil Razdan joined the IAS in 1973 in the Haryana Cadre. After initial stints in Haryana, he moved to the Central Government as Additional and Special Secretary in the Ministry of Petroleum before taking over as Secretary, Ministry of Power. Highly respected as a visionary and man behind many path breaking initiatives in the power sector, he is today one of India's most eminent Energy Experts, Strategic Adviser and Consultant in the field of energy.

Vishnu Bhagwan (Former Chief Secretary Haryana) 
A 1965 batch, Haryana cadre IAS officer Sh. Vishnu Bhagwan has held important positions in the State as well as the Central Government. Positions held by him include Excise & Taxation Commissioner, Deputy Commissioner, Sonepat & Faridabad, Principal Secretary to Chief Minister Om Prakash Chautala and later Chief Secretary Haryana. He was India's representative to the Food and Agricultural Organisation of the UN at Rome.

M.B. Kaushal (Former Secretary Internal Security) 
An IPS officer of the 1963 batch, Sh. M B Kaushal served as Secretary Internal Security, Police & Department of Jammu & Kashmir in the Home Ministry. A recipient of Indian Police Medal for Meritorious Service and the President of India's Police Medal for Distinguished Service, during his illustrious tenure of service Sh. M B Kaushal also served as Director General of Central Reserve Police Force (CRPF) and Police Commissioner of Delhi.

Categories of Awards 

 Lifetime Achievement Award
 Special Jury Award
 Exceptional Contribution Award
 Excellent Contribution Award

Awards Ceremony

Awardees

References

External links 
G Files awards
G Files

Indian awards